Serradigitus gertschi also commonly known as the sawfinger scorpion is a species of scorpion in the family Vaejovidae. The venom has been researched for potential medical applications.

Distribution 
California to Texas and southward into the Baja California peninsula and mainland Mexico.

Subspecies
These two subspecies belong to the species Serradigitus gertschi:
 Serradigitus gertschi gertschi
 Serradigitus gertschi striatus

References

Vaejovidae
Animals described in 1968